Franklin Welsh Bowdon (February 17, 1817 – June 8, 1857) was an American slave owner, politician and an Alabama congressman. He served in the United States House of Representatives from 1846 to 1851.

Biography
Born in Chester District, South Carolina, Bowdon was the son of Samuel and Sarah Welsh Bowdon. He graduated from the University of Alabama in 1836, studied law under Daniel E. Watrous at Montevallo, was admitted to the bar and commenced practice in Talladega, Alabama as the law partner of Messrs. Thomas and Wm. P. Chilton, and Tignall W. Jones.  He married Sarah E Chilton, on March 15, 1840 at Talladega, Alabama.  She was the daughter of Thomas Chilton and Frances Chilton.

Career
Bowdon served as a member of the Alabama House of Representatives in 1844 and 1845.  He was elected as a Democrat to the Twenty-ninth United States Congress to fill the vacancy caused by the death of Felix G. McConnell. He was reelected to the Thirtieth United States Congress and Thirty-first United States Congress. He was chairman of the Committee on Public Buildings and Grounds during the Thirty-first Congress. He served as a U. S. Representative from December 7, 1846 to March 3, 1851. He did not stand for reelection in 1850 and moved to Henderson, Rusk County, Texas in 1852, where he resumed his law practice as the partner of George W. Chilton.

Death
Bowdon died in Henderson on June 8, 1857 (age 40 years, 111 days). He is interred at City Cemetery, Henderson, Texas.  The town of Bowdon, Georgia was named after him. He was the uncle of Sydney Johnston Bowie, who was an Alabama congressman from 1901 to 1907.

References

External links

1817 births
1857 deaths
People from Chester County, South Carolina
Democratic Party members of the United States House of Representatives from Alabama
19th-century American politicians
American slave owners